The Women's 4 × 400 metres relay race at the 2011 European Athletics Indoor Championships was held at March 6, 2011 at 17:15 local time.

Records

Results

The race was held at 17:15.

References

4 × 400 metres relay at the European Athletics Indoor Championships
2011 European Athletics Indoor Championships
2011 in women's athletics